Vitz may refer to
 Toyota Vitz, a car
Vitz-sur-Authie, a commune in France
Mut-vitz, a coffee cooperative in Mexico
Vitz (surname)

See also
Witz (disambiguation)